Mint tea is a herbal tea made by infusing mint leaves in hot water. Mint tea made with peppermint leaves is called peppermint tea, and mint tea made with spearmint is called spearmint tea. There also exist teas that infuse peppermint and spearmint leaves. In Korea, traditional mint tea called bakha-cha is made with East Asian wild mint leaves.

Due to the high content of essential oils in leaves (1–2.5%), especially menthol, mint tea is popular for its curative effects. Affecting the digestive system and excretion of gastric juices, it is thought to act as an anti-inflammatory.

Gallery

See also
Maghrebi mint tea, green tea prepared with mint

References 

Herbal tea
Korean tea